Djanel Welch Cheng (born August 28, 1994) is a Filipina volleyball player. She currently plays for the Petro Gazz Angels in the Premier Volleyball League.

Personal life
She and her sister Desiree Cheng both play volleyball.

Career
Djanel Cheng was a member of De La Salle College of Saint Benilde women's volleyball team. Her team claimed the first championship title in the NCAA in the NCAA Season 91 volleyball tournaments.

In 2022, Cheng makes her comeback in Petro Gazz Angels as she transferred from Sta. Lucia Lady Realtors in 2020.

Clubs
  Shopinas.com Lady Clickers - (2015–2016)
   Cignal HD Spikers - (2016 PSL All-Filipino Conference)
  F2 Logistics Cargo Movers - (2016 PSL Grand Prix Conference)
  Sta. Lucia Lady Realtors - (2017–2018, 2020–2022)
  Petro Gazz Angels - (2018–2020, 2022–present)

Awards

Individuals

Collegiate

Clubs

References

Filipino women's volleyball players
1994 births
Living people
21st-century Filipino women
Setters (volleyball)